West Mamprusi Municipal Assembly is one of the six districts in North East Region, Ghana. Originally created as an ordinary district assembly in 1988 when it was known as West Mamprusi District, which was created from the former Mamprusi District Council, until the western part of the district was split off on 28 June 2012 to create Mamprugu-Moagduri District; thus the remaining part has been retained as West Mamprusi District. However, on 15 March 2018, it was elevated to municipal district assembly status to become West Mamprusi Municipal District. The municipality is located in the western part of North East Region and has Walewale as its capital town. Other settlements within the municipal assembly include Wulugu.

Geography
The Municipality is located within longitudes 0°35’W and 1°45’W and Latitude 9°55’N and 10°35’N. It has a total land size area of 2610.44 km2.

It shares boundaries with East Mamprusi Municipal and Gushegu Municipal to the east; North Gonja District, Savelugu Municipal and Kumbungu District to the south; Builsa North District, Kassena-Nankana Municipal and Bolgatanga Municipal (Upper East Region) to the north and to the west, Mamprusi Moagduri District.

Population
The population of the Municipality according to 2010 population and housing census stands at 121,117 with 59,566 males and 61,551 females.

History
Before the creation of the 20 districts, in 1988, West Mamprusi District was part of the 48 districts that were created under the government of Ghana's decentralization and local government reform policy. The district was carved out of the old Gambaga District in the Northern Region.

Location
It is bordered to the north by Builsa, Kasena-Nankana and Bolgatanga Districts, in the Upper East Region; to the south by North Gonja, Karaga, Kumbungu and Savelugu Districts in the Northern Region; to the west by the Sissala East and Wa East Districts; and to the East by East Mamprusi Municipal Assembly.

Member of Parliament (MPs)

External links 
 
 GhanaDistricts.com

References 

North East Region, Ghana